Stephen Michael Tulloch (born January 1, 1985) is a former American football linebacker. He was drafted by the Tennessee Titans in the fourth round of the 2006 NFL Draft. He played college football at North Carolina State. He was also a member of the Detroit Lions and Philadelphia Eagles.

College career
After graduating from Miami Killian High School, Tulloch played college football at North Carolina State and was the MVP of the Meineke Car Care Bowl in a 2005 victory over the University of South Florida. After his junior season, he announced that he would forgo his senior season and enter the 2006 NFL Draft.

Professional career

Tennessee Titans
The Tennessee Titans selected Tulloch in the fourth round (116th overall) of the 2006 NFL Draft. He played for them from 2006 to 2010, recording 457 tackles, 4.5 sacks and two interceptions.

Detroit Lions
Tulloch signed with the Detroit Lions on July 31, 2011. During his first year with the Lions he started all 16 games, recording 111 tackles, three sacks and two interceptions. One of his sacks was against Tim Tebow where he celebrated the sack by tebowing. He re-signed to a five-year contract with the Lions on March 20, 2012. In 2012, Tulloch was named recipient of the Detroit Lions-Detroit Sports Broadcasters Association/Pro Football Writers Association's Media-Friendly "Good Guy Award" for his interactions with the media in Detroit. On September 21, 2014, Tulloch tore his ACL while celebrating a sack of Aaron Rodgers in the first quarter of the week 3 game against the Green Bay Packers. He was placed on season-ending injured reserve on September 22, 2014.

On July 5, 2016, Tulloch was released by the Lions.

Philadelphia Eagles
On August 21, 2016, Tulloch signed a one-year, $3 million contract with the Philadelphia Eagles, reuniting him with defensive coordinator Jim Schwartz, whom he played for in Tennessee, from 2006 to 2008, and Detroit, from 2011 to 2013.

Retirement
On April 18, 2017, Tulloch announced his retirement from the NFL after 11 seasons. He has remained active in the Detroit community following his retirement, and attends Detroit Lions alumni events with his former team.

References

External links
Official website
Detroit Lions bio
Tennessee Titans bio
NC State Wolfpack bio

1985 births
Living people
American football linebackers
NC State Wolfpack football players
Tennessee Titans players
Detroit Lions players
Miami Killian Senior High School alumni
Players of American football from Miami
Philadelphia Eagles players